Stróża-Kolonia  is a village in the administrative district of Gmina Kraśnik, within Kraśnik County, Lublin Voivodeship, in eastern Poland.

In 2007 the village had a population of 944.

References

Villages in Kraśnik County